Two ships of the Royal Danish Navy have been named HDMS Esbern Snare, named after Esbern the Resolute, brother of Absalon:

 The first , was a  purchased from the Royal Navy in 1952.

Royal Danish Navy ship names